Bagadageri is a village in Dharwad district of Karnataka, India.

Demographics 
As of the 2011 Census of India there were 328 households in Bagadageri and a total population of 1,457 consisting of 756 males and 701 females. There were 180 children ages 0-6.

References

Villages in Dharwad district